Llwydiarth is a small village in Powys, Wales. It is located near Lake Vyrnwy. The village is mostly made up of a caravan park and holiday centre. It does however have a church dedicated to Saint Mary and a sub post office with a filling petrol station. The village is located near Llanfihangel. It is not served by any public transport with the nearest railway station in Machynlleth. The nearest bus stop is in Llanfyllin.

References

External links
, Vision of Britain, retrieved 18 November 2019
, Ordnance Survey, retrieved 18 November 2019
, Post Office retrieved 18 November 2019
, Geronigo, retrieved 18 November 2019
, Francis Frith.com retrieved 18 November 2019
, coflein.gov.uk retrieved 18 November 2019

Powys
Villages in Wales